Pasiones encendidas is a Mexican telenovela produced by Ernesto Alonso for Televisa in 1978.

Cast 
Amparo Rivelles as Maria
Valentin Trujillo as Marcial
Amparo Rivelles as María
Jorge Vargas as Eduardo
Fernando Balzaretti as Antonio
Carlos Bracho as Fernando
Aarón Hernán as Luis / Luciano
Susana Alexander as Adriana
Veronica Castro as Martha
Andrea Palma
Rita Macedo as Elvira
María Rubio as Lidia
María Martin as Prudencia
Marina Dorell
José Alonso
Tony Bravo
Julieta Egurrola

References

External links 

Mexican telenovelas
1978 telenovelas
Televisa telenovelas
Spanish-language telenovelas
1978 Mexican television series debuts
1978 Mexican television series endings